Lyn Gardner is a British theatre critic, children's writer and journalist who contributes reviews and articles to The Stage, Stagedoor and has written for The Guardian.

Theatre critic and educator
A graduate in drama and English from the University of Kent, Gardner was a founding member of the City Limits magazine, a cooperative for which she edited the theatre section. Later, she was a contributor to The Independent.

Gardner joined The Guardian as theatre critic in 1995, and remained on the paper for twenty-three years, taking a particular interest in fringe and more alternative theatre, while Michael Billington covered the most mainstream productions.  Latterly she was writing 130 reviews and 28,000 words of features annually, as well as 150 posts a year for an online blog for the paper, begun in 2008. The paper discontinued her blog in 2017 citing cost pressures, and the following year let her go.

Since June 2017 Gardner had been an Associate Editor of The Stage newspaper, where she continues to write her theatre blog. Gardner was also taken on to teach an MA in Dramatic Writing at Drama Centre London at Central Saint Martins.

Children's writer
Gardner is a writer of children's novels, the earliest being Into the Woods (2006) and Out of the Woods (2010), both illustrated by Mini Grey and published by David Fickling Books. ISFDB catalogues it as the "Storm Eden" series.

She has written six further children's novels for Nosy Crow, known as the "Stage School Series", base around a young girl named Olivia attending Stage School. They have been well received, and a final seventh book was published in July 2013. The first in the series was Olivia's First Term.

See also

References

External links
 
 Lyn Gardner at Twitter

Alumni of the University of Kent
British children's writers
British journalists
British theatre critics
Living people
The Guardian journalists
Year of birth missing (living people)